Randy Howard (1960–1999) was an American bluegrass, country and old time fiddler.

Early life
Howard was born in Georgia, USA. He grew up in Milledgeville. As a child he learned to play several instruments, including fiddle, and won his first fiddle contest at the age of 18 in Union Grove, North Carolina.

Career
Howard was the first prize fiddler at the inaugural Tri-State Bluegrass Association fiddle contest in 1982.
Howard worked as a session musician in Nashville beginning in 1990.  He played with many well-known musicians and bands, including George Jones and Ricky Skaggs. He continued to win many fiddle contests.

Howard performed on two albums with the Lonesome River Band. He was a guest artist on an album by Allen Shadd. He was named fiddle player of the year at the International Bluegrass Music Awards in 1996.

Howard died of cancer in 1999. That year he was once more named fiddle player of the year at the International Bluegrass Music Awards. An album of his recordings, I Rest My Case, was released posthumously by Sugar Hill Records in 2001.

Discography
Raw Guitar, Robin Kessinger.
Randy Howard, Atlantic, 1988. 
One Step Forward, Lonesome River Band, Sugar Hill Records, 1996 
Finding the Way, Lonesome River Band Sugar Hill Records, 1998.
Shore to Shore, Mae McKenna, 1999
I Rest my Case, 2001.

References

American country fiddlers
American bluegrass fiddlers
1960 births
People from Milledgeville, Georgia
1999 deaths
Country musicians from Georgia (U.S. state)